Victor & Hugo: Bunglers in Crime (also known as Victor & Hugo) is a British animated series made by Cosgrove Hall Productions for Thames Television and broadcast on Children's ITV from 6 September 1991 to 29 December 1992. Its eponymous characters were based on the villains Gaston and Pierre from the 1987–1989 series Count Duckula.

Victor & Hugo was Cosgrove Hall's second cel-animated production to be assisted by the Spanish animation studio Alfonso Productions, as well as their last cel-animated project before the collapse of Thames Television (who lost the 1991 ITV regional franchise round to Carlton Television as a result of bidding too low a month after it premiered, and as such, none of its thirty episodes were ever seen more than once in the United Kingdom). However, it was later repeated on television in Germany as well as Cyprus, Gibraltar, Bosnia, Belize and the Falkland Islands on the military television network BFBS (and its former channel SSVC Television).

Unlike most other Thames Television-era Cosgrove Hall series, Victor & Hugo was never released on DVD (except for its first episode, "Panda-Monium", which was released as part of a Cosgrove Hall-based compilation disc called "Most Wanted Classic Kids' TV" by its former distributor, Fremantle International, on 14 April 2003, but as with their other Cosgrove Hall-based DVDs, this is now out of print).

It was also the last Cosgrove Hall show to feature the voices of Brian Trueman and David Jason, and featured guest appearances from many of the company's earlier characters, including Danger Mouse, Count Duckula, Soames and Potson, and even Damson Bunhandler (a pig newscaster from two episodes of Danger Mouse, who started three episodes with reports about the brothers' most recent crimes).

History
As mentioned above, Victor and Hugo were based on the two five-time villains of Gaston and Pierre from Count Duckula; while Gaston was a tall, thin black stork, and Pierre a stubby, short parakeet, both Victor and Hugo were humans, but they lived in a world populated by anthropomorphic animals (possibly to allow for guest appearances from other, non-human Cosgrove Hall characters). Many of the actions and phrases first used for Gaston and Pierre were reused for Victor and Hugo, such as Gaston shoving Pierre's beret in his mouth to keep him quiet, "Why is it that it is?", "Yes, but mainly no!", and "It is your fault, it is all your fault, it is always your fault!".

Additional characters (such as Interpol the parrot, Ernst Underfelt, Monsieur Meccaneaux and the Hobbes-Sutclyffe family) were created specifically for this show; the character of Wyatt Eartle in the fourth episode "Cowboys and Indiscipline" is also a parody of Wyatt Earp (and a reference to the fact that he is a turtle) while the character of Achilles Marrot in the thirteenth episode "Blunder on the Orient Express" is a parody of Hercule Poirot (the episode's name is also a spoof of Murder on the Orient Express).

Premise
The series centred on the exploits of two bumbling French criminal brothers, who were the eponymous Victor and Hugo; despite referencing the French author Victor Hugo in their names, both brothers were not particularly intelligent (but Victor was the more intelligent).
The plot of every episode focused on Victor, Hugo, Interpol (their parrot), and their English-based business "Naughtiness International" getting hired by criminal figures to steal something - and Victor would come up with a "meticulous plan" to achieve this goal, which was routinely botched by Hugo. Most episodes usually ended with the brothers imprisoned (but others, including the first and last, did not).

Main characters

Victor
The taller of the brothers, Victor was also clearly the leader for Naughtiness International; his two most striking characteristics were his fedora hat and his manicured moustache (the latter enabling him to appear suave, and also making him resemble a spiv). He also wore a pair of white gloves, which had been given to him for his birthday by Interpol (as referenced in the tenth episode "Scout's Dishonour", which was also the fourth episode he was seen without them) - and his English was significantly better than Hugo's, although he was continuously at risk of making spoonerisms. Despite his constant raging at Hugo, Victor did show on multiple occasions that he secretly cared deeply about his brother (like in the ninth episode, "Dummy Run", in which he was worried that Hugo had been frozen to death when he opened his suitcase and found Gary Gaingridge's dummy, Gaston, inside); he was voiced by Jimmy Hibbert.

Hugo
Victor's younger brother, Hugo always wore a beret and actually looked like a burglar, right down to his ever-present eye-mask; he was always subservient to "My Victor" and was often the butt of slapstick comedy (he also had a pet earwig named Penelope who he kept in a matchbox but Interpol did not like her and she felt the same way about him). While his intelligence (and English skills) were notably inferior to those of Victor, Hugo was often able to make sense of his brother's spoonerisms - and he would often describe their chosen profession as "criminiminals". Despite the notable handicap of a lack of ability, he also always had the job of driving the van; Hugo's voice, like that of Pierre from Count Duckula, bore a striking resemblance to that used by Peter Sellers for the Goon Show character Bluebottle, and the two characters often made similar exclamations. He was voiced by David Jason.

Interpol the Parrot
A cynical East End Multicolour (which is a very rare breed of parrot), Interpol lived in Victor and Hugo's van, and provided a voice of reason in rapid-fire Cockney English; it is not saying very much to comment that Interpol was by far the most intelligent member of the group. Aside from residing in the van constantly, Interpol was also able to function as a telephone - he would ring when sat on his perch, and his beak was put to the person's ear. Victor also used him to dial out by pressing his talons like a keypad; in one episode, Hugo used him as a makeshift pair of scissors. He was also voiced by David Jason, but had no dialogue for the episode "Treasure Haunt".

The Wretched Dog
A small dog played a very important role in most episodes; at various points, often when the plot appeared to be flagging, the dog would run up one of Victor's trouser legs, remove his boxer shorts and run off with them down his other leg. This running gag also appeared at the end of most episodes (prefaced by the statement by a glum Victor that "At least in here, nothing else can possibly go wrong!") - and Hugo particularly enjoyed the dog's appearances, often muttering "good doggie!". In production material from the now-demolished Cosgrove Hall studio, the dog's name is given as Baskerville (as in the Sherlock Holmes tale The Hound of the Baskervilles), although, he was never referred to as such on screen; one episode that he is known never to appear in is the eighth one, "The Case of the Vose Vase", but he also does not appear in the eleventh episode, "Escort Red-Handed" (which was the first to feature Hawkeye Soames and Dr. Potson).

Monsieur Meccaneaux
Despite his French name, M. Meccaneaux was a working-class accented English rat who was frequently called by the brothers to repair the van (generally after Hugo's bad driving had caused an accident), and on occasion, to provide other forms of technical expertise such as the construction of the Concrete Destruction Ray (known by Victor as the "Discreet Correction Ray"); he was also voiced by David Jason.

Catchphrases

Much of the humour for the series derived from catchphrases (some of which were previously used by Gaston and Pierre); among these were:
"That is what I said." - Victor, on being corrected (by anyone); this was created specifically for the show and was not used by Gaston.
"Nothing else can possibly go wrong." - Victor (normally), the cue for the Wretched Dog to remove his boxer shorts at an episode's end.
"Gordon Bennett, Where's me tablets?" - Interpol expressing surprise and consternation; it was again created specifically for the show.
"That's what I think, anyway." - Hugo's summation of the situation; this was also used at the end of the starting and finishing themes.
"Yes, and no, but mainly, no." - Hugo, answering Victor's question; this had previously been pioneered by Pierre for Count Duckula.
"Help, the police! No, help!!!" - Hugo's panic attacks on hearing the word "police"; they were the only thing that he was terrified of.
"We are famous international criminals." - Hugo inadvertently revealing his identity (Victor would often say that he was just kidding).
"It is your fault, it is all your fault, it is always your fault!" - Victor becoming angry with Hugo and blaming him for their failures (usually when they had been arrested, but also in "Tempers Fugit" after Maximilian J. Millennium pressed the stolen clock's button and disappeared); this had previously been pioneered by Gaston for Count Duckula.

Episode list

Series 1 (1991)
All thirteen of the first series' episodes were screened on ITV as part of the Children's ITV strand on Fridays at 4:05pm; however, on 4 and 11 October 1991, the Children's ITV strand started at the later time of 4:35pm as a result of ITV's rugby coverage on those two days and Anglia Television's Knightmare, which was into its fifth series by this time, was the first programme of the day, so the fifth episode "Hyp-Not-Isn't" was not seen until 18 October.

Series 2 (1992)
The first fifteen episodes of the second series were, for a second time, screened on ITV on Fridays as part of the Children's ITV strand at 4:05pm; however, the sixteenth and penultimate one was screened six days after the fifteenth one on Christmas Eve 1992 (which was Thames Television's penultimate Thursday), and the seventeenth and final one was screened five days later on Thames' final ever Tuesday.

Tie-in book series
Apart from Thames Video's VHS release of the first, fifth and sixth episodes (which is now almost impossible to find), this show spawned a series of six tie-in books by Jimmy Hibbert, Robin Kingsland and Rod Green, published by HarperCollins Publishers and Boxtree; they featured Cosgrove Hall's short-lived triangular logo on their front covers (which was a reference to Thames Television's final one, introduced in 1990), and entitled "Fu Man's Choo Choo", "The Big Nap", "Out to Lunch", "The Great Golden Turnip Caper", "The Great Train Robbery", and "Where Beagles Dare". The two HarperCollins-published hardback books by Hibbert were also released as audio cassettes, read by Hibbert himself as narrator and Victor - but Peter Sallis filled in for David Jason as Hugo and Interpol on these cassettes.

References

External links

Cosgrove Hall Ate My Brain's fan page featuring production information
Victor & Hugo: Bunglers in Crime at Toonhound

1990s British animated television series
ITV children's television shows
Television series by Fremantle (company)
Television series by FremantleMedia Kids & Family
Television shows produced by Thames Television
1991 British television series debuts
1992 British television series endings
1990s British children's television series
English-language television shows
Television series by Cosgrove Hall Films
Danger Mouse